MI11, or Military Intelligence, Section 11, was a department of the British Directorate of Military Intelligence, part of the War Office. 

During the Second World War, MI11 was responsible for field security: protecting British military personnel from enemy agents and "fifth columnists" amongst civilian populations, in theatres of war. As such, MI11 assumed a role formerly assigned to the Field Security Police (which had itself replaced the British Army's Intelligence unit before World War I). 

Section 11 was disbanded after World War II.

External links
 574 FIELD SECURITY SECTION OF 3 SPECIAL SERVICE BRIG

Groups of World War II
Security
Defunct United Kingdom intelligence agencies
Military communications of the United Kingdom
War Office in World War II
British intelligence services of World War II